Abdullah Yılmaz (born 18 March 1961) is a Turkish cross-country skier. He competed at the 1988 Winter Olympics and the 1992 Winter Olympics.

References

1961 births
Living people
Turkish male cross-country skiers
Olympic cross-country skiers of Turkey
Cross-country skiers at the 1988 Winter Olympics
Cross-country skiers at the 1992 Winter Olympics
Sportspeople from Ağrı
20th-century Turkish people